Lateropora is a genus of flowering plants belonging to the family Ericaceae.

Its native range is Central America.

Species:

Lateropora ovata 
Lateropora santafeensis 
Lateropora tubulifera

References

Ericaceae
Ericaceae genera